The 1948–49 season was Port Vale's 37th season of football in the English Football League, and their fourth full season in the Third Division South. A promotion campaign soon tailed off into an unremarkable mid-table finish, as bad form persuaded the club to sell off Bill Pointon for a then-club record fee.

Overview

Third Division South
The pre-season saw the club attempt to sign Huddersfield Town's star forward Peter Doherty, when this failed Gordon Hodgson instead signed Liverpool left-wing duo Stan Palk and Mick Hulligan for £10,000. Striker Walter Aveyard was also signed from Birmingham City, despite his belief that a leg injury had finished him. Fans were convinced promotion to the Second Division was possible, and so there was a surge in season ticket sales.

The season started with seven points from the opening four games, leaving the club top of the table. The season-high 18,497 fans that turned up for a 3–0 win over Aldershot were impressed by the skill of the three new signings. The club's good form continued to the end of September, despite the sale of Walter Keeley to Accrington Stanley for £1,500 – who had found himself relegated to the sidelines by Hulligan's good performances. After this Hulligan broke his ankle, whilst other injuries also hit the squad. Six weeks of six defeats in seven games followed, leaving Vale sixth from bottom. During this spell Joe Dale was offloaded to Witton Albion, as Hodgson attempted to fill the gaps in the first team with young reserves. Winning three games on the trot, the Vale put an end to this bad spell, also keeping three clean sheets.

Over the Christmas period talk was dominated by 'The Wembley of the North', which had been projected as an 80,000 capacity stadium, now it was planned as a 40,000 capacity ground with room for future expansion. Finding just fifty members for the '100 club', the financing was helped by a £8,000 grant from The Football Association. In January the club initiated a fire-sale of players: Bill Pointon went to Queens Park Rangers for a then-club record five-figure fee, whilst Harry Hubbick was sold to Rochdale for around £1,000. Meanwhile, the club transfer listed Palk, Aveyard, and Eric Eastwood (who all lived outside North Staffordshire); whilst Hulligan returned from injury. A two-month run without a win followed, in which Hodgson again experimented with the first eleven. This run finally ended with a 1–0 win over Notts County on 9 April. Nine days later at Ashton Gate, keeper Harry Prince was given a chance in place of regular George Heppell, who embarrassed himself by attempting to punch a forty-yard punt from Stone, only to miss the ball entirely and thereby concede the equalizer. Later in the month, Hodgson signed George King from Hull City for a four-figure fee. King scored twice in his debut against Torquay United.

They finished a disappointing thirteenth, boasting just 39 points. They had scored twelve fewer goals than the previous campaign, though their defensive record was identical. Harry Prince's move to Stafford Rangers was the only significant departure of the summer.

Finances
On the financial side, a large transfer credit helped the club record a gross profit of £7,120. Gate receipts had declined to £25,831, whilst wages had risen to £16,095. The Burslem Supporters Club put forward a donation of £600, and the club issued 22,000 new five shilling shares to help with the New Ground Fund.

Cup competitions
In the FA Cup, Vale were knocked out in the First Round by Notts County at Meadow Lane in front of 36,514 spectators.

League table

Results
Port Vale's score comes first

Football League Third Division South

Results by matchday

Matches

FA Cup

Player statistics

Appearances

Top scorers

Transfers

Transfers in

Transfers out

References
Specific

General

Port Vale F.C. seasons
Port Vale